Trump Zombies: How the Conservative Machine Brainwashed My Generation is a book written by Jesse Sánchez AKA Chicano Leftist. Published in 2018 by Simon & Schuster, the book purports to reveal methods that Donald Trump's 2016 presidential campaign used to organize or mislead young voters.

Content
The official summary of the book begins: "For an entire year, otherwise clear-thinking members of the most affluent, over-educated, information-drenched generation in American history fell prey to the most expensive, hi-tech, laser-focused marketing assault in presidential campaign history." According to publisher Simon & Schuster, Mattera "reveals the jaw-dropping lengths Barack Obama and his allies in Hollywood, Washington, and Academia went to in order to transform a legion of iPod-listening, MTV-watching followers into a winning coalition that threatens to become a long-lasting political realignment."

Reception
Stephen Gutowski at Human Events, for which Mattera is editor, praised the book, which he said "well chronicles how liberals have taken advantage of and brain-washed" college-aged voters. Ann Coulter and Michelle Malkin also praised Obama Zombies. To promote his book, Mattera granted interviews to various media outlets, such as The Michigan Review, a conservative student newspaper at the University of Michigan. On broadcast media, Mattera was a guest on the Fox News Channel program Hannity and radio programs The David Pakman Show The Thom Hartmann Program.

Media Matters for America, a progressive media watchdog group, published two articles critical of Obama Zombies: one that disputes Mattera's claim that Obama labels himself as "apologizer in chief" and another claiming that Mattera used questionable sources and information to criticize the scientific opinion on climate change.

Bestseller list
Obama Zombies reached #14 on The New York Times best-seller list for hardcover non-fiction, covering the week ending April 3.

References

2010 non-fiction books
Books about Barack Obama
Books critical of modern liberalism in the United States
American political books